Intimate (stylized as intimate) is the fourth compilation album by Japanese singer Shizuka Kudo. It was released on December 11, 1991, through Pony Canyon. The album features all singles released from "Koi Hitoyo" (1988) through "Metamorphose" (1991). The opening track, "Dare mo Shiranai Blue Angel" is a re-worked solo recording of an Ushirogami Hikaretai song by the same name released as a B-side to the single "Hora ne, Haru ga Kita" in 1988. The closing track is a new song entitled "Rashikunai", written specifically for the album by Kudo herself, under the pseudonym Aeri.

Commercial performance
Intimate debuted at number four on the Oricon Albums Chart, with 131,000 units sold. It dropped five positions to number nine on its second week, with 48,000 copies sold. With sales of 51,000, Intimate fell to number eleven the following week, where it stayed for two consecutive weeks, selling 25,000 copies on its fourth charting week. The album stayed in the top twenty for two more weeks, charting at number 17 then number 19 and selling 16,000 and 15,000 copies, respectively. Intimate spent eleven weeks in the top 100, selling a reported total of 321,000 copies during its chart run, and ranked at number 52 on the year-end Oricon Albums Chart for 1992.

Track listing

Charts

Certification

Release history

References

1991 compilation albums
Shizuka Kudo albums
Pony Canyon compilation albums